Genetic variant may refer to:
 Single-nucleotide polymorphism (SNP), in a case it is a common genetic variant
 Mutation, in a case where it is a rare genetic variant
 Copy-number variation
 Variant (biology)

See also
 Genetic variation (disambiguation)
 Polymorphism (biology), the effect of genetic variants: a range of phenotypes
 Chromatin variant